The  Ministry of Agriculture, Forestry and Food Security (MAFFS) is a governmental ministry of the Republic of Sierra Leone whose mandate is to formulate agricultural development policies and further advise on other matters relevant to agriculture. Their offices are located on the fourth floor of the Youyi Building, Brookfields, Freetown.

Divisions

Crops Division

Livestock Division

Forestry Division

Agric-Engineering and Services Division

Planning, Evaluation, Monitoring and Statistics Division (PEMSD)

Agricultural Extension Services Division

District Agriculture Offices (DAOs)

References

External links
 Official website

Ministerial departments of the Sierra Leone Government